Aqeel Ahmed (born 28 July 1992) is an amateur boxer from Dundee, Scotland. He represented Scotland in the Commonwealth Games in Glasgow in 2014 and again in Gold Coast in 2018. He is the current British Champion 2016, having defended it from the previous year.

In May 2019, Ahmed was selected to compete at the 2019 European Games in Minsk, Belarus.

Personal life 
Ahmed was born and raised in Dundee in Scotland and currently lives in Motherwell. He is of Pakistani descent.

References

Living people
British sportspeople of Pakistani descent
Scottish male boxers
Scottish people of Pakistani descent
Boxers at the 2014 Commonwealth Games
Boxers at the 2018 Commonwealth Games
Commonwealth Games competitors for Scotland
1992 births
Sportspeople from Dundee
European Games competitors for Great Britain
Boxers at the 2019 European Games
Light-flyweight boxers